The 1945 Carlton Football Club season was the Carlton Football Club's 82nd season of competition, and 49th as a member of the Australian Football League. Carlton fielded teams in the senior and reserves grades of the 1982 VFL season.

Under coach Percy Bentley, Carlton recovered from a middling 3–6 start to win thirteen of its last fourteen games, winning the premiership by defeating  in the Grand Final. It was the 7th senior VFL premiership in the club's history.

Club summary
The 1945 VFL season was the 49th season of the VFL competition since its inception in 1897; and, having competed in every season, it was also the 49th season contested by the Carlton Football Club. As it had been since 1897, the club's home ground was Carlton Oval in Princes Park, North Carlton. In addition to its senior team, Carlton fielded a team in the VFL seconds. Its thirds (under-19s) team contested the Northern District Football Association, and development teams East Brunswick, Brunswick City and Prince's Hill contested the Victorian Junior Football League. The club reported 4,623 full 10/6 memberships and 712 5/- memberships (total 5,335), up from 3,936 and 489 (total 4,425) in 1944, but still short of its pre-war record membership of 7,700; but the club saw a profit of only £213, down from £503, owing to the new arrangements for pooling gate receipts across the league.

Senior personnel
Kenneth Luke continued as club president through 1945, a position he had held since the 1938 season. Harry Bell continued as the secretary, a role he had held since 1940.

Bob Chitty, in his ninth season with the club, was appointed the new captain of the club; he replaced 1944 acting-captain Bob Atkinson, who returned to captain his former VFA side Coburg. Bob Green was appointed vice-captain at the start of the year, then Rod McLean took over after Green was transferred on service.

Squad and player statistics for 1945
The following is the full list of players who were on the Carlton senior and supplementary lists through the 1945 season. Numbers in parentheses represent games played and goals kicked for Carlton during the season.

Playing list changes
The following summarises key player transfers to and from the club between the conclusion of the 1944 season and the conclusion of the 1945 season.

World War II was still ongoing during the season, so the availability of players who were in the military would depend on where they were posted; players who were temporarily gained or lost by the club due to military service are included here. Additionally, the Victorian Football Association returned to competition after three years' recess, and VFA players who had played for Carlton during the war on wartime permits automatically became VFA players; these players needed to be re-cleared to the VFL before resuming with Carlton.

In
Bernie Bignell (returned from service)
Jim Clapton (from Coburg)
Hal Hanton (from service and Frankston)
Adrian Hearn (from )
Ron Hines (returned from service)
Jim Jones (returned from service)
Cyril Mann (returned from service)
Fred Rose (from services and Sea Lake)
Ken Hands (from North Geelong, and cleared from 's zone after Round 3)
Lance Collins (returned from service to Coburg, then cleared back to Carlton after Round 5)
Ken Baxter, (returned from service after Round 11)
Bert Deacon (returned from service to Preston, then cleared back to Carlton after Round 13)

Out
Bob Atkinson (to Coburg)
Frank Anderson (to Preston)
Bert Butler (to Bacchus Marsh)
Jack Conley (away on service)
Ollie Grieve (away on service)
Ern Henfry (away on service, then returned to Perth)
Jack Howell (away on service)
Les McCann (away on service)
Ken McLean (away on service)
Les Marden (to Coburg)
Paul Schmidt (to Devonport)
Ted Tuohill (retired)
Jack Wrout (retired)
Cyril Mann (to Brunswick, after Round 5)
Bob Green (transferred on service after Round 7)
Les Gregory (to Preston, after Round 9)
Adrian Hearn (to Brunswick, after Round 10)

Other players who were already playing with the Carlton seconds, but who were elevated and made their senior debuts in 1945 were Wal Alexander, Clinton Wines and Don Beauvais. Carlton also notably signed up Jim Davies from Swan Districts, who had won the 1944 Sandover Medal in the under-age WANFL competition; but he was transferred away from Melbourne on service before playing a game and returned to Swan Districts in 1946. He later returned to Carlton in 1949.

Season summary

Home and away season
The club entered the home-and-away season with an overall inexperienced team, noted as speedy but lacking in big, experienced key position players. The highly regarded half-backline combination of 1943 had suffered with the loss of Jim Francis to retirement and Frank Anderson to Preston, and Bob Atkinson had also been lost from the back pocket, leaving Bob Chitty as the only established key defender. A total of 18 players from the 1944 list were unavailable. Carlton also had a limited preseason, due in part to the Carlton Cricket Club occupying the ground later than usual as it won its first district cricket pennant (albeit in the unofficial wartime competition); simultaneous intra-club matches were played at 2:45 Saturday 7 April at Princes Park and Ransford Oval, then again at 2:45 Saturday 14 April at Princes Park and McAllister Oval. As a result, sportswriters did not have high expectations of Carlton for the season.

The club was described as "surely the weakest Carlton team sent out in years", and it was again noted that the small players were reasonable but the lack of key position players was a major problem. After the early losses, Carlton started rebuilding, adopting something of a youth policy; no fewer than eight older but underperforming players – Bernie Bignell, Les Gregory, Arthur Hall, Adrian Hearn, Jim Jones, Cyril Mann, Fred Rose, and vice captain Bob Green – were omitted by the end of Round 6; among them, only Jones ever played for Carlton again.

Carlton improved over the following six weeks, with three wins and three losses, to move to 9th place with a 3–6 record overall. The Round 7 game against Richmond was almost won: holding a one-point lead, Frank McGrath had taken a saving mark in defence, before played on and being caught dropping the ball, Richmond's Bob Bawden kicked the winning goal from the free kick, which was the last kick of the game.

Recruits of star key position players as the season progressed strengthened the Carlton team down the spine. The Blues recruited 18-year-old Geelong junior Ken Hands after Round 3, who made an immediate impression at centre half forward, and was touted as a future champion by the press within a month. Coburg key position player Lance Collins, who had played for Carlton on a wartime permit, was cleared back to Carlton after Round 5; and, after making little impact at pivot, was moved to full forward and led the club in goalkicking for the season. Star forward Ken Baxter returned from three years of active service after Round 11. Finally, Bert Deacon, another VFA player who had played with the club on a wartime permit, was cleared to the club after Round 13, immediately became one of the league's best players, holding down the centre half-back position and giving the Blues the best half-back line in the league. This, coupled with Vin Brown serviceably adapting to his new position at full back, gradually turned Carlton into one of the league's strongest teams through the second half of the season, with strength in both key positions and small players. The line-up became very settled, with very selection changes made in the last two months of the season.

This translated into a remarkable improvement in results starting with wins against fourth-placed  and first-placed  in Rounds 10 and 11. After four straight wins which had seen the club rise to 7th place, Carlton suffered an upset loss against an out-of-form , which itself had lost six straight games, in a dramatic ending in which Essendon kicked three goals in the final two minutes of the game to snatch a three-point with only 13 seconds left. Sportswriters noted that this loss would likely end the Blues' faint hopes of playing finals, as they were two wins and percentage behind fourth place with six games left.

However, Carlton's performances continued to strengthen. This set up, for the second consecutive year, a final round clash against third placed , the winner of which would qualify for the finals. Footscray had won the equivalent match in 1944 by one point, kicked after the siren by Harry Hickey; but this year, in front of a then-record crowd of 30,000 at the Western Oval, Carlton dominated with a seven-goals-to-two first quarter before winning by 53 points. This saw Carlton enter the top four for the first time in the season, in fourth place with a 13–7 record, after winning ten of its last eleven home-and-away matches.

Ladder

Finals series
The finals series was staged at Carlton Oval, as a result of the Melbourne Cricket Ground once again being unavailable due to its role in the war effort. Carlton had staged the 1942 and 1943 finals, and the St Kilda Cricket Ground had staged the 1944 finals; but lower capacity and attendance at St Kilda encouraged the league to return the finals to Carlton for 1945. Additional terraces were installed at the ground in August, to increase the official capacity to 62,800.

Despite being in fourth place, Carlton's strong form in the second half of the season meant they were considered a genuine premiership threat by sportswriters. Through the latter stages of the season and into the finals, coach Percy Bentley conducted very limited Thursday training sessions, to reduce the pressure to the team which had played in so many consecutive pseudo-elimination games.

Carlton faced third-placed  in the first semi-final, which was in its first ever VFL finals series, and whose late season form had been a little bit patchy. Carlton dominated the game and won easily. Although the final margin was only 26 points, Carlton had led 13.7 (85) to 2.13 (25) at three-quarter time, before North Melbourne added respectability to the scoreboard with a six-goals-to-one final quarter. Lance Collins scored a VFL career-high eight goals in the match.

The preliminary final against , was a vicious, and famous affair. Collingwood was by far the better team throughout the game, with Carlton not playing as well as it had been; Hands and Deacon both had rare off games. Collingwood held a 28-point lead at quarter time, a 9-point lead at half-time, and opened up a game-high 34-point lead after kicking the first goal of the final quarter. At the same time, the Blues engaged in rough play to try to put their smaller Collingwood opponents off their game, and melee involving twelve players broke out early in the final quarter. After the melee, Carlton mounted a massive comeback, and kicked the next five goals in a fifteen-minute purple patch, to reduce the margin to two points. Then Lance Collins, who had kicked the first goal of the rally, was again the hero, kicking the last two goals of the game late to steal a ten-point win. The roughness of the game drew condemnation, but only one player – Fred Fitzgibbon – was reported and suspended.

Carlton faced minor premiers  in the Grand Final. Played in blustery, then rainy conditions, it was a low quality and rough game better remembered for its violence than its gameplay, and eventually gaining its nickname "The Bloodbath" from the several melees which broke out. The game was closely fought through the first half, Carlton holding a two-point lead at half time. Carlton pulled away with a five-goals-to-two the third quarter to lead by 23 points at three-quarter time, and managed to keep at least a two-goal buffer through the rough final quarter before winning by a game-high 28 points. Three Carlton players were suspended: captain Bob Chitty and Don Grossman for eight weeks, and Fred Fitzgibbon – who was already suspended after the preliminary final and who ran onto the ground from the outer to join a melee – for four weeks. Four South Melbourne players were also suspended. Bob Chitty's strikes behind play of two of South Melbourne's young stars were the main instigators of the game's violence, and – by the later admission of South Melbourne star Laurie Nash – successfully did much to distract South Melbourne from its game in the second half. Vin Brown was the best player on the ground, and the win gave Carlton its seventh premiership.

Premiership team
The Carlton premiership nineteen was as below. Among them, five players – Bob Chitty, Rod McLean, Ken Baxter, Mick Price and Charlie McInnes – had previously played in the club's 1938 premiership win. McInnes was the reserve in both games.

Fred Fitzgibbon was missing from the premiership team, after having been suspended for four matches for striking 's Len Hustler in the preliminary final; McInnes came into the team as 19th man to replace him. Three players had been injured in the preliminary final and were doubtful for the Grand Final: Jim Baird (concussion), Ron Hines (thigh) and Ron Savage (rib). Of them, only Hines failed to recover and he was omitted on the morning of the match, replaced by Alec Way as the emergency.

The premiership players each received a silver teaset valued at ten guineas from the club as a reward.

Leading Goalkickers
Despite coming to the club only after Round 5, and initially being recruited to play centre, Lance Collins ultimately moved to the forward-line and was Carlton's leading goalkicker for the season. It was the only time Collins won the award, in what was the only of Collins' three seasons with Carlton in which he played more than ten games.

Team awards and records
Game records
Round 3 – Carlton's 100-point loss against  set a new club record for the heaviest defeat in its history, breaking the previous record of 94 points set in 1904.
Round 3 – As of 2021, Carlton's 100-point loss holds the record for the heaviest loss in a match by a season's eventual premiers.

Season records
Carlton became the first club to win the VFL premiership from fourth place on the ladder under the Page–McIntyre system, and the first under any system since 's 1916 premiership from fourth place under the Argus finals system.

Individual awards and records
Robert Reynolds Trophy
The Robert Reynolds Trophy for Carlton's senior best and fairest was awarded to ruckman Ron Savage. It was Savage's first and only best-and-fairest for the club, won in his eighth and final year with the club. Ken Baxter, despite playing only thirteen games after his return from service, finished second.

Other awards presented by the club were:
 Arthur Sanger – most consistent
 Vin Brown – most improved
 Bert Deacon – most serviceable
 Clinton Wines – best first year player
 Ken Hands – most promising
 Rod McLean and Mick Price – best team men
 Lance Collins – inspiring play
 Jim Baird – consistent play
 Doug Williams – improved play
 Jack Bennett – special efforts

Representative honours
One Carlton player – Ron Savage – was selected for Victoria for the interstate match against South Australia on 7 July. Selection policies dictated that two players would be selected from each of the top eight clubs, and one from each of the bottom four – which was where Carlton was positioned at the time of selection.
Two Carlton players – Ron Hines and Jim Clark – represented the North-of-the-Yarra team in the charity match against South-of-the-Yarra on Monday 18 June. Two others – Ken Hands, Ron Savage – were selected in the team but withdrew due to injury.

Other
Percy Beames of the Age named Bert Deacon as the most outstanding player in league football for the year, despite having played only ten games for the year, ahead of Des Fothergill. Described him as "great versatility and sustained brilliance through each game", and "perhaps the best key player since the early days of L. Nash".

Seconds
The Carlton seconds team finished sixth out of twelve teams with a win–loss record of 12–8, two games and percentage outside the final four.

Footnotes 
1.  could still have played finals with a loss against Carlton if  had also lost in Round 20. North Melbourne ultimately defeated  by six points, kicking the winning goal inside the final minute, resulting in Footscray's elimination.

References

Carlton Football Club seasons
1945 in Australian rules football